Vaidiki Velanadu is a sub-caste of Telugu speaking Smarta Brahmins whose ancestral roots lie in velanadu region, the ancient name for the coastal region on the banks of River Krishna in the Guntur district and Prakasam district. Some may have roots in Northern Andhra Pradesh near Vishakapatnam or Srikakulam. They are classified as Pancha-Dravida brahmins. They are predominantly followers of Adi Shankaracharya and are located in Andhra Pradesh. However, There is a small subset of them who remain Shrauta brahmins. Most Vaidiki Velanadu Brahmins follow the Apastamba Dharmasutra and belong to the Taittiriya Shakha of the Krishna Yajur Veda.

The earliest reference to Vaidiki Velanadu starts from 12th century. Early references mention that the Velanadu Brahmins have a martial tradition, and many have fought bravely in the Battle of Palanadu on the side of Brahma Naidu.

Most of the Telugu-speaking priests of Smarta tradition and all of the Telugu Shrauta brahmins are from this sect. However, the people have diversified into other professions like military service, sports, politics, arts, medicine, advocacy, science, engineering and academics.

References

 B S L Hanumantha Rao, Social Mobility in Medieval Andhra, Telugu Academy Press
 Christopher Alan Bayly, Rulers, Townsmen, and Bazaars: North Indian Society in the Age of British Expansion, 1770–1870, Cambridge University Press, 1983
 Durga Prasad, History of the Andhras up to 1565 A. D., P. G. PUBLISHERS, GUNTUR (1988)

Telugu Brahmin communities
Social groups of Andhra Pradesh